Morique (Morike) is an extinct, poorly attested Arawakan language that was spoken between the Ucayali River and Javari River in Peru. It is closely related to Chamicuro.

References

Indigenous languages of the South American Northern Foothills
Arawakan languages
Extinct languages